This is a list of members of the Tasmanian House of Assembly between the 1872 and the 1877 colonial elections.

Notes 
  In November 1872, James Reid Scott, the member for Selby, resigned. Frederick Innes, the Premier of Tasmania, was elected unopposed on 18 November 1872.
  In July 1873, Thomas Chapman, the member for East Hobart, resigned. Philip Fysh was elected unopposed on 12 August 1873.
  In November 1873, Frederick Innes, the member for Selby, resigned. David Murray won the resulting by-election on 16 December 1873.
  In February 1874, James Cox, the member for North Launceston, resigned. Frederick Innes was elected unopposed on 31 March 1874.
  In April 1874, Alexander Clerke, the member for Ringwood, resigned. William Gellibrand was elected unopposed on 15 May 1874.
  In April 1874, John Millar, the member for Westbury, resigned. Thomas Reibey was elected unopposed on 23 May 1874.
  In January 1875, John Swan, the member for Cumberland, resigned. Nicholas John Brown won the resulting by-election on 29 January 1875.
  In April 1875, Henry Lette, the member for Central Launceston, resigned. George Gilmore was elected unopposed on 21 May 1875.
  In June 1876, George Wilson, the member for Oatlands, resigned. Alfred Pillinger won the resulting by-election on 17 July 1876.
  In June 1876, John Alexander Jackson, the member for Queenborough, resigned. Robert Gayer won the resulting by-election on 21 July 1876.
  On 20 July 1876, Charles Meredith was appointed to the Ministry. He was therefore required to resign and contest a ministerial by-election. However, his nomination was ruled informal, and on 3 August 1876, the seat was declared for the only candidate, Andrew Crawford. Meredith was not without a seat for long, however—Frederick Houghton, the member for Norfolk Plains, resigned, and on 24 August 1876, Meredith was elected unopposed to that seat.
  On 20 July 1876, George Gilmore was appointed to the Ministry. He was therefore required to resign and contest a ministerial by-election, at which he was defeated on 3 August 1876 by Charles Bromby.
  In March 1877, James Gray, the member for West Hobart, resigned. John Balfe won the resulting by-election on 18 April 1877. Balfe, in running for the seat, had vacated his South Launceston seat, which was filled at the 27 April 1877 by-election by Samuel Tulloch.

Sources
 
 Parliament of Tasmania (2006). The Parliament of Tasmania from 1856

Members of Tasmanian parliaments by term
19th-century Australian politicians